Ghemical is a computational chemistry software package written in C++ and released under the GNU General Public License. The program has graphical user interface based on GTK+2 and supports quantum mechanical and molecular mechanic models, with geometry optimization, molecular dynamics, and a large set of visualization tools. Ghemical relies on external code to provide the quantum-mechanical calculations — MOPAC provides the semi-empirical MNDO, MINDO, AM1, and PM3 methods, and MPQC methods based on Hartree–Fock calculations.

The chemical expert system is based on OpenBabel, which provides basis functionality like atom typing, rotamer generation and import/export of chemical file formats.

See also
 Open Babel — chemical expert system
 XDrawChem — 2D drawing program, also based on Open Babel
 Molecule editor
 Avogadro (software)

References

External links
 Ghemical home page
 Ghemical version that interfaces GAMESS (US)
 Ghemical plugin for Bioclipse
 A Guide to Ghemical in finnish 

Computational chemistry software
Free software programmed in C++
Free chemistry software
Free educational software
Science software that uses GTK